Flightplan is a 2005 mystery psychological thriller film directed by Robert Schwentke from a screenplay written by Peter A. Dowling and Billy Ray. It stars Jodie Foster as Kyle Pratt, a recently-widowed American aircraft engineer living in Berlin, who flies back to the U.S. with her daughter and her husband's body. She loses her daughter during the flight and must struggle to find her while proving her sanity at the same time. It also features Peter Sarsgaard, Erika Christensen, Kate Beahan, Greta Scacchi, Sean Bean, and Matt Bomer.

Flightplan was distributed by Touchstone Pictures and was released worldwide theatrically on September 23, 2005. The film received mixed reviews from critics, who praised the direction, performances of the cast (particularly Foster's), and the thriller elements of the film but criticized the screenplay. It was a major box office success, grossing over $223 million worldwide against a $55 million budget, and received two nominations at the 32nd Saturn Awards; Best Action or Adventure Film, and Best Actress (for Foster).

Plot
Recently-widowed Berlin-based American aviation engineer Kyle Pratt takes her husband David's body back to the U.S. with her 6-year-old daughter Julia, aboard an aircraft she helped design, a brand new Elgin E-474 (loosely based on the Airbus A380) operated by Aalto Airlines. Awakening from a nap, Kyle finds Julia missing, and none of the passengers or crew recall seeing her. Flight attendant Stephanie tells Kyle there is no record of her daughter boarding the flight, and Kyle is unable to find Julia's boarding pass and backpack. At Kyle's insistence, Captain Marcus Rich conducts a search of the aircraft, while the panicked Kyle is monitored by sky marshal Gene Carson.

Kyle reveals that her husband died falling from their roof, which she refuses to believe was suicide. Captain Rich receives a message from a Berlin hospital that Julia died with her father, and is convinced that Kyle, unhinged by her husband's and daughter's deaths, imagined bringing Julia on board. The increasingly erratic Kyle is confined to her seat, where a therapist, Lisa, consoles her. Kyle doubts her own sanity until she notices the heart Julia drew in the condensation on the window next to her seat.

Kyle asks to use the bathroom, where she climbs into the  overhead crawl space and sabotages the aircraft's electronics. In the ensuing chaos, she rides a dumbwaiter to the lower freight deck and unlocks David's casket, suspecting Julia is inside, but finds only her husband's body. Carson escorts her to her seat in handcuffs, and explains that the flight is making an emergency stopover at Goose Bay Airport, in the Canadian province of Newfoundland and Labrador, where she will be taken into custody.

She pleads with Carson to search the aircraft's hold, and he sneaks down to the freight deck. Removing two explosives and a detonator concealed in David's casket, he plants the explosives in the avionics section. It is revealed that Carson and Stephanie have conspired to hijack the aircraft for a $50 million ransom and frame Kyle, due to her knowledge of the aircraft; they abducted Julia to induce Kyle to unlock the casket. Carson lies to Rich that Kyle is threatening to bomb the aircraft unless the ransom is wired to a bank account and a G3 aircraft is readied upon landing. He then plans to detonate the explosives, killing Julia, and leave Kyle dead with the detonator.

Landing in Newfoundland, the airliner is surrounded by FBI agents. Kyle confronts Rich, who angrily declares that the ransom has been paid. Kyle realizes that Carson is the perpetrator and, assuming the role of hijacker, commands Carson to remain aboard and the crew to leave. She strikes Carson with a fire extinguisher, handcuffs him to a rail, and takes the detonator. Carson frees himself and pursues Kyle, who locks herself in the cockpit, but manages to draw Carson away with a ruse so she can escape. After an altercation with Kyle, Stephanie flees the airliner.

Kyle finds the unconscious Julia but then is found by Carson, who reveals that he murdered David in order to smuggle the explosives inside his casket. Kyle escapes with Julia into the aircraft's non-combustible hold as Carson shoots at her. She detonates the explosives, killing Carson and damaging the aircraft's landing gear, but she and Julia emerge unscathed as the crew realize she had been telling the truth all along. The next morning, Captain Rich apologizes to Kyle as Stephanie is led away by FBI agents, while another agent informs them that the Berlin mortuary director has also been arrested. Kyle carries Julia through the crowd of passengers who realize the truth. As a passenger assists Kyle in loading her luggage onto a waiting van, Julia awakens and asks if they have arrived.

Cast

Production

Development
Peter A. Dowling had the idea for Flightplan in 1999 on a phone conversation with a friend. His original pitch for producer Brian Grazer involved a man who worked on airport security doing a business trip from the United States to Hong Kong, and during the flight his son went missing. A few years later, Billy Ray took over the script, taking out the terrorists from the story and putting more emphasis on the protagonist, who became a female as Grazer thought it would be a good role for Jodie Foster. The story then focused on the main character regaining her psyche, and added the post-September 11 attacks tension and paranoia. There was also an attempt to hide the identity of the villain by showcasing the different characters on the plane. Both Dowling and Ray were allowed to visit the insides of a Boeing 747 at the Los Angeles International Airport to develop the limited space on which the story takes place. The film also draws on Alfred Hitchcock's The Lady Vanishes, in which an older woman goes missing on board a train and only one passenger remembers her, especially in the scene where Kyle discovers the heart drawn by her daughter on the plane window.

Casting
Schwentke said that to make Flightplan as realistic as possible, he wanted naturalistic, subdued performances. One example was Peter Sarsgaard, whom he described as an actor "who can all of a sudden become a snake uncoiling". First-time actress Marlene Lawston was cast as Foster's character's daughter Julia. Sean Bean was cast to subvert his typecasting as a villain and mislead audiences into thinking he was part of the villainous plot. The director also picked each of the 300 passengers through auditions.

Filming
Schwentke described Flightplan as a "slow boiling" thriller, where the opening is different from the faster ending parts. The director added that sound was used to put audiences "off-kilter".

The art direction team had to build all the interiors and the cockpit of the fictional E-474 from scratch, basing both the interior design and layout on the Airbus A380. The amount of dead space within the cabin, cargo and avionic areas of the E-474 did not reflect the actual amount of dead space within any aircraft. BE Aerospace provided various objects to "stage the scene"; "many of the interior sets used real aircraft components such as seats, gallies, etc."

To allow for varied camera angles, the set had many tracks for the camera dolly to move, and both the walls and the ceiling were built on hinges so they could easily be swung open for shooting. The design and colors tried to invoke the mood for each scene. For instance, a white room for "eerie, clinical, cold" moments, lower ceilings for claustrophobia, and wide open spaces to give no clues to the audience. Most exterior scenes of the E-474 involve a model one-tenth of the aircraft's actual size, with the images being subsequently enhanced through computer-generated imagery. The explosion in the nose involved both life sized and scaled pieces of scenery. A one-half scale set of the avionics area was constructed to make the explosion and fireball look bigger.

Music
The score for Flightplan was released September 20, 2005, on Hollywood Records. The music was composed and conducted by James Horner, and the disc contains eight tracks. Horner stated that film's score tried to mix the sound effects with "the emotion and drive of the music", and the instruments were picked to match the "feelings of panic" Kyle goes through. These included Gamelan instruments, prepared piano, and string arrangements. No brass instruments are used in the soundtrack.

Reception

Box office
Flightplan opened at #1 in US and Canada, grossing over $24 million in its opening weekend. It grossed $89,707,299 at the domestic box office and $133,680,000 overseas for a worldwide total of $223,387,299. It also grossed $79,270,000 on DVD rentals.

Critical response
On Rotten Tomatoes the film has an approval rating of 37% based on 179 reviews, with an average rating of 5.3/10. The site's critics consensus states: "The actors are all on key here, but as the movie progresses, tension deflates as the far-fetched plot kicks in." On Metacritic, it has a weighted average score of 53 out of 100 rating, based on 33 critics, indicating "mixed or average reviews". Audiences surveyed by CinemaScore gave the film an average grade B+ on an A+ to F scale.

Film historian Leonard Maltin in Leonard Maltin's 2012 Movie Guide (2011)  described Flightplan as "suspenseful at first, this thriller becomes remote and un-involving; by the climax, it's just plain ridiculous."

Roger Ebert gave it 3 and a half out of 4 stars, praising its "airtight plot" and the acting performances. Other reviewers including the Christian Science Monitor criticised "plotholes the size of an Airbus in the script".

Aviation film historian Simon D. Beck in The Aircraft-Spotter's Film and Television Companion (2016) noted that Flightplan was careful in setting the scene. "The aircraft is a fictional mammoth airliner called the 'E-474', a double-deck jumbo modeled strongly after the Airbus A-380, the large size being suitable for the missing-person plot of the film."

Controversy
The Association of Professional Flight Attendants called for an official boycott of Flightplan, which they said depicts flight attendants as rude and unhelpful.

See also
 Red Eye, another 2005 psychological thriller taking place during a flight

Notes

References

Bibliography

 Beck, Simon D. The Aircraft-Spotter's Film and Television Companion. Jefferson, North Carolina: McFarland and Company, 2016. .
 Maltin, Leonard. Leonard Maltin's 2012 Movie Guide. New York: Plume Books, 2011. .

External links
 
 

2005 films
English-language German films
2000s German-language films
2005 action thriller films
2000s mystery thriller films
2005 psychological thriller films
American aviation films
American mystery thriller films
American psychological thriller films
German mystery thriller films
German psychological thriller films
Films about aviation accidents or incidents
Films about aircraft hijackings
Films about missing people
Films about terrorism
Films directed by Robert Schwentke
Films produced by Brian Grazer
Films scored by James Horner
Films set in Berlin
Films set on airplanes
Films with screenplays by Billy Ray
Babelsberg Studio films
Imagine Entertainment films
Touchstone Pictures films
2000s American films
2000s German films